Red Storm is a South Korean webtoon series written by Noh Kyungchan and drawn by Park Hyun-il.

Red Storm was first a novel before becoming a webtoon. Kyungchan Noh, the author, had written a novel, titled by the same name, back in the year of 2006. It was later that this same novel became adapted into a webtoon, published by Daum, by the year of 2012. Novel was published by Rok Media with over 300 pages for each of the 6 volumes released - containing of average 7 chapters each. It was later republished by In-Time Network, to be resurfaced, as an easily accessible online novel by March 2014.
As of yet, the Korean Novel has not been licensed into other languages.

Setting and plot
Red Storm follows the life and adventures of Yulian Provoke, the Young Glow (Glow is a title similar to Chieftain) of the Pareia Tribe, who dreams of becoming the strongest warrior of the Red Desert. The early parts of the story focus on Yulian meeting Noya, a powerful man from a different dimension, who later becomes his master and teaches him a unique martial art. As the story progresses, the webtoon tells of Yulian's goal of creating a team of warriors strong enough to solve any problem called "Red Storm".

Characters

Yulian Provoke
Yulian Provoke, also known as "Young Glow" is the main protagonist of the manhwa Red Storm.
He is the eldest son of the Glow of Pareia tribe Baguna Provoke. He is disciple of Cheon Myeong Hoon, and leader of the Red Storm military division.

Cheon Myeong Hoon
Cheon Myeong Hoon, or better known as Noya, is the master of the main protagonist Yulian Provoke. Noya is a powerful and venerated figure. However, his immense abilities give him a self-assured confidence that borders at times on outright cockiness. He is generally apathetic, and constantly searches for a challenge that can excite him.

Shubeon
Shubeon, Shubeon is an orphan, his mother died shortly after giving birth to him during attack on Pareia tribe. Few years after, his father died as well, and he got adopted by a warrior in the tribe, just to see him die afterwards too, this prompted people in the tribe to call him Cursed Child, as death seemed to follow Shubeon. He saw two more foster-fathers die, including Vultion. However that has given him tribal name "The Undying One", he is a warrior of Pareia and an officer in Red Storm

Triquel Wikito
Triquel Wikito is a Commander of Red Storm. A shaman-turned-warrior, Trekol is a proficient fighter, but primarily notable for his combination of tribal magic, sword skills, and brilliant mind. He was killed by an enemy great warrior after assuring the victory for his people.

Haisha Sanaken
Haisha Sanaken "The Befitting One" is a warrior of the Pareia Tribe, and the first born son of his family. He is currently a Vice-Captain of Red Storm, and is commonly considered the strategic commander.

Thrint
"The One Who Blazes Brilliantly" Thrint is a Warrior of Pareia Tribe and officer of Red Storm. He appeared during Warrior Ceremony arc and he was fifth member of Red Storm introduced.

Venersis
Venersis of the Blood-Stained Hand is the Shuaruri Tribe's Great Warrior, captain of the Desert's Blade, and a War God of the Red Desert. Venersis is one of the twelve chosen ones, before the appearance of Yulian Provoke, he was the only one from the desert.

Grace
Grace is the youngest daughter of the Glow Dejaine, leader of the Rivolde Tribe. She is a talented and beautiful warrior, and has been exploring The Field of Demon Beasts since she was young. She was first introduced mocking Yulian as a teen as he struggled to fight a beast, and then lost to her in a fight. Years later she is betrothed to Yulian by their parents agreement. She is now Yulian's first wife.

Tribes

Paraie
Paraie Tribe is a major tribe within the Red Desert that separates the Eastern and Western Continents. The Pareia Tribe consists of many united families that occupy a widespread territory of oases. The Provoke family currently leads the tribe under the rule of Glow Yulian Provoke. Through a series of wars they have brought the eastern half of the Red Desert under their control and subjugated all of the tribes living there.

Shuaruri
A tribe within the Red Desert that has long been at war with its neighboring tribe, The Pareia. It is home to the famous Desert's Blade military division, and its leader, The War God Venersis.

Shire
Shire Tribe are a small tribe with only about 500 strong, but they are all skilled shamans or to be shamans. They are also the keepers of every single magic spell of the desert. They were in charge of the ceremony since ancient times. They always maintained neutrality between the tribes and in doing so maintained reputation and the meaning of warrior ceremony.

Abuso
Abuso Tribe was first seen and introduced when Doyle of Abuso Tribe offended Pareia's glow's honor in front of Pere during Warrior Ceremony.

Vega
Vega Tribe is desert tribe that exists between the Pareia and Shuaruri. In the Vega tradition, only women may lead and become warrior.

Metipi
Metipi Tribesmen seems to have tattoos below the eyes which marks them uniquely. According to the merchants chased by Hebina, Metipi is an abnormally large tribe.

Dupure
Dupure Tribe is the only known tribe that has retained desert tribes' original knowledge of Great Sword usage

Rivolde
Not much is known about Sarion tribe, they are a tribe that prepared a Rejion trap together with Rivolde Tribe. They were in danger due to Rejion overpopulation, they couldn't fight off the huge numbers of Rejions, after Yulian messed up the costly Rejion trap that took them half a year to make, Grace suggested they will need to relocate.

Sarion

Shuaruri Tribe

External links 
 Red Storm official website on Daum
 Red Storm official website on Spottoon

Manhwa titles
2012 webtoon debuts
2010s webtoons
South Korean webtoons
Action comics